Ashley Buchanan (born 1974) is an American business executive. He is chief executive officer of The Michaels Companies, former chief merchandising officer and chief operating officer of Walmart's e-commerce business and a member of The Michaels Companies board of directors.

Early life and education 
Buchanan was born in 1974 in Mount Pleasant, Texas. He is the eldest of three children born to Patricia (Patti) and James Buchanan, a businessman. He attended college at Baylor University where he studied business and played tennis on the university's NCAA Division I tennis team. Buchanan graduated from the Hankamer School of Business in 1996 with a Bachelor of Business Administration in finance and real estate. Buchanan received an Master of Business Administration degree from Hankamer School of Business in 1998.

Career

Early career
Buchanan started his career in banking at Bank of America in 1996.  After receiving his Master of Business Administration degree, Buchanan worked as a retail consultant at Accenture from 1996 to 2004. He worked at Dell Computers from 2004 to 2007 as a finance manager.

Walmart
From 2007 to 2020, Buchanan worked at Walmart, starting with the first ten years at Walmart US leading several business units.

In February 2017, Buchanan was named chief merchant of Walmart's Sam's Club business unit.

In 2019, Buchanan was named executive vice president and chief merchandising officer of Walmart.com, where he was part of the effort to invest in Walmart's digital shopping experience, to compete with online giant Amazon.

Michaels
In 2020, Buchanan joined The Michaels Companies as the chief executive officer and a member of the board of directors.

In March 2021, it was announced that The Michaels Companies was being acquired by private equity firm Apollo Global Management, and would be going private.

Other professional activities
Buchanan is also an independent director on the board of directors of private label packaged foods company TreeHouse Foods.

References 

1974 births
Living people
Baylor University alumni
American chief executives of Fortune 500 companies